Roosevelt Elementary School may refer to:

 Roosevelt Elementary School (Santa Ana, California)
 Roosevelt Elementary School (Tampa, Florida)
 Roosevelt Elementary School (Waterloo, Iowa)
 Roosevelt Elementary School (Philadelphia, Pennsylvania)
 Roosevelt Elementary School (Laredo, Texas)

See also
 Roosevelt High School (disambiguation)
 Roosevelt Intermediate School
 Roosevelt Junior High School (disambiguation)
 Roosevelt Middle School (disambiguation)
 Roosevelt School (disambiguation)